This is a list of places in Gabon.

Cities and towns

Mountains 

Mount Iboundji
Mount Pele
Mount Koum

Rivers 
 Ogooué
 Ivindo
 Zadié
 Echira

National Parks 
 Lopé Reserve
 Loango National Park

 
Places
Gabon